Blažek (pronounced Blah-zhek; feminine Blažková) is a common Czech surname which originates from the Czech given name Blažej (Blaise). It may refer to:

 Barbora Blažková, Czech ski jumper
 Jakub Blažek, Czech footballer
 Jan Blažek, Czech footballer
 Jaromír Blažek, Czech footballer
 Jaroslava Blažková, Slovak writer
 Jindřich Blažek, Czech rower
 Lubor Blažek, Czech basketball coach
 Michael Blazek, American baseball player
 Milada Blažková, Czech field hockey player
 Miloslav Blažek, Czech ice hockey player
 Pavol Blažek, Slovak athlete
 Petr Blažek, Czech modern pentathlete
 Václav Blažek, Czech linguist

See also 
 Błażek, a village in Poland

Czech-language surnames
Surnames from given names